T News is a Telugu news television channel in the Indian state of Telangana. The channel is owned by TRS party. The channel focuses exclusively on news, events, and culture of the Telangana. The channel brings up history, self-respect of Telangana. Its slogan is Telangana Gunde Chappudu, meaning The pulse of Telangana. The channel also has Urdu news bulletins in some evening slots.

The channel is based in Hyderabad, Telangana, India. Occasionally T News broadcasts bulletins in the Urdu language. It offers breaking news, live reports, exclusive interviews, political debates, sports, weather, entertainment, business updates and current affairs.

T News programs
Aadab Telangana
Bhakthi Margalu
Bollywood Talkies
Chenu Chelaka
Filmi Duniya
Good Afternoon
Good Evening
Good Morning
Health Plus
Journey
Maya Bazar
Namasthe Telangana
News Tonight
Open
Singareni Sravanthi
Singidi
Study Guide
Telangana 360
Trendz
Power of Numerology
Vaarthalu Live
Vaidyam Arogyam Live
Vishwaroopam
Weekend Dhoom Dham
Weekend Singidi

Availability
This channel is telecast through Telangana Cable TV Networks, Tata Sky, Videocon d2h, Reliance Digital TV, Airtel digital TV, Dish TV and Sun Direct. The channel's live video feed is also streamed on its website, and YouTube.

History
The channel was previously associated with Raj News. T News was launched on 4 April 2011 (Ugadi day) after receiving permission to operate as independent TV channel.

References

External links
 Official site
 T News Live
 T News Article Site

Telugu-language television channels
24-hour television news channels in India
Television channels and stations established in 2011
Television stations in Hyderabad